Paolo Ottavi (born 7 January 1986) is an Italian artistic gymnast. He represented Italy at the 2012 Summer Olympics, finishing 22nd in the individual all-around competition.

Ottavi was born in Fermo and began his gymnastics training at the age of six. He has been a member of Italian Senior National Team and the Centro Sportivo Aeronautica Militare since 2008.

References

External links
 

1986 births
Living people
Italian male artistic gymnasts
Gymnasts at the 2012 Summer Olympics
Olympic gymnasts of Italy
Gymnasts of Centro Sportivo Aeronautica Militare
People from Fermo
Mediterranean Games gold medalists for Italy
Mediterranean Games medalists in gymnastics
Competitors at the 2013 Mediterranean Games
Sportspeople from the Province of Fermo